Claus Holm (4 August 1918 – 21 September 1996) was a German film actor. He appeared in 50 films between 1943 and 1979. He was born in Bochum, Germany and died in Berlin, Germany.

Selected filmography

 Floh im Ohr (1943) - Knecht Hannes
 The Bath in the Barn (1943) - Pieter, Müllersohn
 Raid (1947) - Karl Lorenz, Kriminal-Anwärter
 Marriage in the Shadows (1947) - Dr. Herbert Blohm
  (1948) - Ernst Rothkegel
 Quartet of Five (1949) - Martin Bergau
 The Merry Wives of Windsor (1950) - Herr Fluth (Ford)
 The Axe of Wandsbek (1951) - SA-Sturmführer Trowe
 Zugverkehr unregelmäßig (1951) - Jochen Böhling
 Sein großer Sieg (1952) - Hans Netterman
 The Country Schoolmaster (1954) - Uwe Karsten Alslev
 Captain Wronski (1954) - Dornbusch
 The Plot to Assassinate Hitler (1955) - Oberleutnant H.
 The Priest from Kirchfeld (1955) - Vinzenz Heller, Pfarrer von Kirchfeld
 When the Alpine Roses Bloom (1955) - Franzl
 Two Blue Eyes (1955) - Dr. Michael Arndt
 Fruit Without Love (1956) - Georg Kling
 Winter in the Woods (1956) - Martin
 Der Glockengießer von Tirol (1956) - Georg, Geselle
 Like Once Lili Marleen (1956) - Oberarzt Dr. Robert Berger
 Der Adler vom Velsatal (1957) - Toni Erlbacher
  (1957) - Peter
 The Devil Strikes at Night (1957) - Kriminalkommissar Axel Kersten
 Für zwei Groschen Zärtlichkeit (1957) - Hendrik Pedersen
 Die Lindenwirtin vom Donaustrand (1957) - Fred
 Girls of the Night (1958) - Le père Hermann
 Rivalen der Manege (1958) - Alexander 'Bimbo' Peters genannt Ras Tagore
 The Girl from the Marsh Croft (1958) - Gudmund Erlandsson
 The Tiger of Eschnapur (1959) - Dr. Walter Rhode
 The Indian Tomb (1959) - Dr. Walter Rhode
 Im Namen einer Mutter (1960) - Dr. Felix Sperber

 Blind Justice (1961) - Dr. Werner Rüttgen
  (1962) - Arnold Lewandowski
The Curse of the Yellow Snake (1963) - Inspektor Frazer
 Among Vultures (1964) - 'Reverend' Weller (voice, uncredited)
 Is Paris Burning? (1966) - Huhm (uncredited)
 Raumpatrouille Orion (1966, TV Series) - Hasso Sigbjörnson
 Die Nibelungen (1966) - Gernot (voice, uncredited)
 Die Nibelungen, Teil 2 - Kriemhilds Rache (1967) - Gernot (voice, uncredited)
 The Monk with the Whip (1967) - Glenn Powers
 Death and Diamonds (1968) - Butt Lancaster
 Sünde mit Rabatt (1968) - Weber
 The Gorilla of Soho (1968) - Dr. Jeckyll
  (1978) - Georg Friedrichs
 The Marriage of Maria Braun (1979) - Doctor
 The Third Generation (1979) - Opa Gast
 Berlin Alexanderplatz (1980, TV Mini-Series) - Wirt / Gastwirt Max

References

External links

1918 births
1996 deaths
German male film actors
People from Bochum
20th-century German male actors